Ayako is a feminine Japanese given name.

Possible writings
Ayako can be written using different kanji characters and can mean:
 文子, "writings, child"
 綾子, "twill, child"
 絢子, "kimono design, child"
 彩子, "coloring, child"
 順子, "order, child"
 礼子, "courtesy, child"
 亜矢子, "Asia, arrow, child"
 安夜子, "peaceful, night, child"
The name can also be written in hiragana or katakana.

People with the name
, Japanese model and actress
, Japanese politician
, Japanese enka singer
, Japanese writer, actress and daughter of Steven Seagal
, Japanese-Mexican professional wrestler
, Japanese model and beauty pageant winner
, Japanese tennis player
, Japanese singer-songwriter
, Japanese comedian
, Japanese-born American journalist
, Japanese announcer
, Japanese middle-distance runner
, Japanese announcer
, Japanese voice actress and pop singer
, Japanese hurdler
, Japanese women's footballer
, Japanese synchronized swimmer
, Japanese novelist
Ayako Miyazaki (born 1982), Japanese cricketer
, former Japanese princess
, Japanese swimmer
, Japanese cricketer
, Japanese physician and television personality
, Japanese golfer
, Japanese volleyball player
, Japanese badminton player
, Japanese volleyball player
, Japanese shogi player
, Japanese voice actress
, Japanese jazz musician
, Japanese sport wrestler 
, Japanese writer
, Japanese speed skater
Ayako Tsuru (born 1941), Mexican artist
, Japanese golfer
, Japanese classical pianist
, Japanese actress
, Japanese rower
, Japanese sprinter and long jumper

Fictional characters
, a character in the manga series Slam Dunk
, a character in the video game Tokimeki Memorial
, a character in the video game series Variable Geo

Japanese feminine given names